Palmia is monotypic moth genus in the family Sesiidae erected by William Beutenmüller in 1896. Its only species, Palmia praecedens, was described by Henry Edwards in 1883.

References

Sesiidae
Monotypic moth genera